Ikey or IKey may refer to:

People

People with the nickname
 nickname of John C. Karel (1873–1938), American politician, judge, lawyer, college football player and coach
 Isaiah "Ikey" Owens (1974–2014), American keyboardist
 Ikey Solomon (1787?–1850), English criminal fence, regarded as the model for Charles Dickens' character Fagin

Pseudonym
 Ikey Solomons, Esq. Junior, William Makepeace Thackeray's pen name for Catherine, his first novel

Other uses
 IKey, an American computer parts manufacturer
 Ikeys, nickname is University of Cape Town
 Ikey Tigers, a University of Cape Town rugby union team

See also
 Kike (disambiguation)

Lists of people by nickname
Hypocorisms